The Kent Salver is an annual rugby union knock-out club competition organized by the Kent Rugby Football Union. It was first introduced during the 2005-06 season, with the inaugural winners being Guy's Hospital.  It is the fifth most important rugby union cup competition in Kent, behind the Kent Cup, Kent Shield, Kent Vase and Kent Plate.

The Kent Salver is currently open to the first teams of club sides based in Kent that have been knocked out of the first round of the Kent Vase.  The format is a knockout cup with a first round, semi-finals and a final, typically to be held at a pre-determined ground at the end of April on the same date and venue as the Cup, Shield, Vase and Plate finals.

Kent Salver winners

Number of wins
Brockleians (2)
Dartfordians (2)
Sheppey (2)
Sittingbourne (2)
Ashford (1)
Cranbrook (1)
Gillingham Anchorians (1)
Greenwich (1)
Guy's Hospital (1)
 Faversham RUFC (2)

See also
 Kent RFU
 Kent Cup
 Kent Shield
 Kent Vase
 Kent Plate
 English rugby union system
 Rugby union in England

References

External links
 Kent RFU

Recurring sporting events established in 2005
2005 establishments in England
Rugby union cup competitions in England
Rugby union in Kent